Adoxophyes prosiliens is a moth of the family Tortricidae. It is found in Vietnam and on the Andaman Islands in the Indian Ocean.

References

Moths described in 1928
Adoxophyes
Moths of Oceania
Moths of Asia